The neuropeptide S receptor (NPSR) is a member of the G-protein coupled receptor superfamily of integral membrane proteins which binds neuropeptide S (NPS). It was formerly an orphan receptor, GPR154, until the discovery of neuropeptide S as the endogenous ligand. Increased expression of this gene in ciliated cells of the respiratory epithelium and in bronchial smooth muscle cells is associated with asthma. This gene is a member of the G protein-coupled receptor 1 family and encodes a plasma membrane protein. Mutations in this gene have also been associated with this disease.

Clinical significance 

In the CNS, activation of the NPSR by NPS promotes arousal and anxiolytic-like effects.

In addition, mututations in NPSR have been linked to a susceptibility to asthma (rs3249801, A107I).  Hence NPSR has also been called GPRA (G protein-coupled receptor for asthma susceptibility).  Activation of NPSR in the airway epithelium has a number of effects including upregulation of matrix metalloproteinases which are involved in the pathogenesis of asthma. It has been shown that activation of NPSR by NPS affects both gastrointestinal motility and mucosal permeability simultaneously. Aberrant signaling and upregulation of NPSR1 could potentially exacerbate dysmotility and hyperpermeability by local mechanisms in gastrointestinal functional and inflammatory reactions.

The very rare NPSR mutation Y206H, which makes the receptor more sensitive to NPS, is found in human families that need less sleep time than normal ones. It has similar effects in transgenic mice, making them resistant to memory impairment caused by lack of sleep.

References

Further reading

External links 
 
 

G protein-coupled receptors